Mayar Hany, also known as Mayar Hany Abdelrahman and Mayar Hany Mohamed (born 5 February 1997 in Cairo) is an Egyptian professional squash player. As of February 2018, she was ranked number 34 in the world.

References

1997 births
Living people
Egyptian female squash players
Sportspeople from Cairo
21st-century Egyptian women